Nathanael Greene Academy is a private PK-12 school in Siloam, Georgia, a small town in Greene County.

History
Nathanael Greene Academy was founded in 1969 as a segregation academy. In its first year of operations it had no black students or teachers.

Student body
In 2018, the school had 3 Black, and no Asian or Hispanic students. Surrounding Greene County has a population that is about 40% Black. For the 2018–19 school year, the student body included a low percentage of minority students.

References

Schools in Greene County, Georgia
Private high schools in Georgia (U.S. state)
Private middle schools in Georgia (U.S. state)
Private elementary schools in Georgia (U.S. state)
Preparatory schools in Georgia (U.S. state)
Segregation academies in Georgia